Gooseberry Falls State Park is a state park of Minnesota, United States, on the North Shore of Lake Superior. The park is located in Silver Creek Township, about 13 miles (21 km) northeast of Two Harbors, Minnesota in Lake County on scenic Minnesota Highway 61. The park surrounds the mouth of the Gooseberry River and includes Upper, Middle and Lower Gooseberry Falls.

History and facilities

The Minnesota Legislature authorized preservation of the area around Gooseberry Falls in 1933, and the area was officially designated Gooseberry Falls State Park in 1937. The rustic style resources in Gooseberry Falls State Park were constructed by the Civilian Conservation Corps between 1934 and 1941.  The structures are notable for their stone construction, using red, blue, brown, and black basalt.  The designs were supervised by the Minnesota Central Design Office of the National Park Service and construction was supervised by two Italian stonemasons. In 1996, the Joseph N. Alexander visitor center was built, providing space for interpretive displays, a cinema screening room, and a gift shop. The visitor center hosts public events including nature, wildlife, astronomy, and music programs. The architect was Duluth-based David Salmela for which he won the 1997 AIA Minnesota award.

This park provides 70 non-electric camping sites that are available year-round. There are 18 miles (29 km) of hiking trails, including  of mountain bike trails. The trails connect to the Superior Hiking Trail. There are popular picnic and swimming spots on the trails.

Park geology

The north shore of Lake Superior is almost entirely underlain by a series of at least 19 lava flows.  The Gooseberry River has cut through the flows from the uppermost layer to the lower falls where it flows into Lake Superior. Three distinct layers of lava can be seen from the highway bridge.  The lower flows were more compact and hard, but the upper flows were vesicular, containing pockets that later filled with various minerals including  those that formed  the Lake Superior  agates which can be found along the beach  where the river ends in Lake Superior.

Wildlife
This park is home to the mammalian species of white-tailed deer, Canadian lynx, black bear, timber wolf, and marten. Fish that swim in the lakes are migratory salmon and trout. Bird watchers may see a variety of conifer-dependent birds, ravens, and herring gulls.

Gallery

References

DNR Gooseberry Falls facts
MHS Gooseberry Falls page

External links
 Gooseberry Falls State Park

1937 establishments in Minnesota
Civilian Conservation Corps in Minnesota
Park buildings and structures on the National Register of Historic Places in Minnesota
Protected areas established in 1937
Protected areas of Lake County, Minnesota
Rustic architecture in Minnesota
State parks of Minnesota
Waterfalls of Minnesota
Landforms of Lake County, Minnesota
National Register of Historic Places in Lake County, Minnesota